The governor of Jammu and Kashmir was the head of the Indian state Jammu and Kashmir.

When India became independent, Hari Singh was the Maharaja of the Princely State of Jammu and Kashmir. Technically he remained so until 17 November 1952, although from 20 June 1949 his son Karan Singh acted as regent. From 17 November 1952 to 30 March 1965, Karan Singh was the elected as the Sadr-e-Riyasat of the State of Jammu and Kashmir. On 30 March 1965, Karan Singh became the first Governor of Jammu and Kashmir.

The office of governor was abolished after the Jammu and Kashmir Reorganisation Act, 2019 was passed in August 2019 in the Parliament of India, reorganising the state of Jammu and Kashmir into two union territories; Jammu and Kashmir and Ladakh on 31 October 2019. Provisions contained within the act created the positions of Lieutenant Governor of Jammu and Kashmir and Lieutenant Governor of Ladakh.

Sadr-e-Riyasat of Jammu and Kashmir

Governors of Jammu and Kashmir

Janki Nath Wazir was acting governor after Karan Singh for two months, and Vazhakkulangarayil Khalid was acting governor for 12 days.

Timeline

See also
 Governors in India
 Lieutenant Governor of Jammu and Kashmir
  Lieutenant Governor of Ladakh

References

External links
 India
 Raj Bhawan J&K

 
Jammu and Kashmir
Governors